Nizamabad is a constituency of the Uttar Pradesh Legislative Assembly covering the city of Nizamabad in the Azamgarh district of Uttar Pradesh, India.

Nizamabad is one of five assembly constituencies in the Lalganj Lok Sabha constituency. Since 2008, this assembly constituency is numbered 348 amongst 403 constituencies.

Election results

2022

2017

Members of Legislative Assembly

References

External links
 

Assembly constituencies of Uttar Pradesh
Politics of Azamgarh district